Châtillon-sur-Seine is a commune of the Côte-d'Or department, eastern France.
The Musée du Pays Châtillonnais is housed in old abbey of Notre-Dame de Châtillon, within the town, known for its collection of pre-Roman and Roman relics (especially the famous Vix Grave).

History
Some ruins on an eminence above the town mark the site of a château of the dukes of Burgundy. Nearby stands the church of St Vorles of the 10th century, but with many additions of later date; it contains a sculptured Holy Sepulchre of the 16th century and a number of frescoes. In a fine park stands a modern château built by Marshal Marmont, duke of Ragusa, born at Châtillon in 1774. It was burnt in 1871, and subsequently rebuilt.

Châtillon anciently consisted of two parts, Chaumont, belonging to the duchy of Burgundy, and Bourg, ruled by the bishop of Langres; it did not coalesce into one town until the end of the 16th century. It was taken by the English in 1360 and by Louis XI in 1475, during his struggle with Charles the Bold. Châtillon was one of the first cities to adhere to the League, but suffered severely from the oppression of its garrisons and governors, and in 1595 made voluntary submission to Henry IV. It is associated with the abortive conference of 1814 between the representatives of Napoleon and the Allies.

During World War II the German garrison were forced to withdraw after a successful operation by the Special Air Service operating in the nearby forest in late August 1944.

Geography

Climate
Châtillon-sur-Seine has a oceanic climate (Köppen climate classification Cfb).

Personalities
Châtillon-sur-Seine was the birthplace of:
 Auguste Marmont, duke of Ragusa (1774–1852), Marshal of France
 Anne Nicole Voullemier (1796-1886), painter and lithographer
 Désiré Nisard (1806–1888), author and critic
 Louis Paul Cailletet (1832–1913), physicist and inventor
 Alice Prin (Kiki de Montparnasse) (1901–1953), nightclub singer, actress, model, partner and muse of Man Ray, and painter
 Damien Saez (1977), singer and songwriter.

Population

See also
Communes of the Côte-d'Or department

References

Communes of Côte-d'Or
Lingones
Burgundy
Côte-d'Or communes articles needing translation from French Wikipedia